Svínoy is the only village on the Faroese island of the same name in Klaksvík Municipality. Until 1 January 2009 it was the only village in the now abolished Svínoy Municipality.

The 2015 population was 27. Its postal code is FO 765. Its current church was built in 1878. The name of the island Svínoy means 'Island of Pigs [Swine]'.

See also
 List of towns in the Faroe Islands

External links
Personal Danish site with photographs of Svínoy

Populated places in the Faroe Islands

nl:Svínoy